FC Makila Mabe is a football club in Kikwit, Democratic Republic of Congo.  They play in the Linafoot, the top level of professional football in DR Congo.

Achievements
Bandundu Provincial League: 2
 2005 ,2006

Football clubs in the Democratic Republic of the Congo
Kikwit